Dolores Marquez Clark, better known by her screen name Lolita Rodriguez (January 29, 1935 – November 28, 2016), was a multi-awarded actress in the Philippines. She was paired with Eddie Arenas in Gilda (1956), in which she won her first FAMAS Award for Best Actress. Rodriguez was born to an American father and Filipina mother.

Career
In 1953, at the age of 18, she entered the movie industry. Her first movie was in Sampaguita Pictures Ating Pag-ibig (1953) starring Tita Duran and Pancho Magalona, followed by Apat Na Taga (1953), Cofradia (1953), Mr. Kasintahan (1953), Sabungera (1954), Pilya (1954) with Gloria Romero and Ric Rodrigo, Jack And Jill (1955) with Dolphy and Rogelio dela Rosa, Binibining Kalog (1955) with Ramon Revilla, Tanikalang Apoy (1955) with Paraluman, Kanto Girl (1956) with Oscar Moreno, and Alipin Ng Palad (1959) with Luis Gonzales.
 
She also appeared in action films including Tarhata (1957), Kilabot Sa Makiling (1959), Kapitan Lolita Limbas (1961) with Greg Martin, Eddie Garcia, Lito Legaspi and Josephine Estrada, and Diegong Tabak (1962).

After Sampaguita, she continued her work in cinema whenever a good role beckoned. At the 1968 Manila Film Festival, she was the Best Actress awardee for Kasalanan Kaya?, and also at the 1971 Catholic Mass Media Awards for Stardoom. Her most enduring achievement was starring in Lino Brocka's 1974 drama, Tinimbang Ka Ngunit Kulang.

In 1979, she performed stage play Larawan playing Candida, at Philippine Educational Theater Association (PETA). She appeared in more than 85 movies in drama, comedy and action. During the same year, she made two important films with National Artist Lino Brocka with two equally-superb actresses - Charito Solis in Ina, Kapatid, Anak and Nora Aunor in Ina Ka ng Anak Mo, an entry in the 5th Metro Manila Film Festival (MMFF). The latter screen collaboration eventually made her share the best actress award with the Superstar.

She made a screen comeback in 1985 in Amazaldy Films' "Paradise Inn", an entry in 10th MMMF, sharing equal billing with Vivian Velez. In 1991, she did a movie-made-for-television entitled, Lucia directed by Mel Chionglo.

Personal life
She is daughter of an American father, William Charles Clark, and a Filipino mother, Carmen Marquez. Rodriguez was born in Urdaneta, Pangasinan. She married, and later divorced Eddie Arenas, also from Sampaguita Pictures. They have three children: Maria Dolores (Birdie), Eduardo Jr. (Bogey), and Maria Carmen (Par). All three are married with families of their own.  The singer, Radha, is Bogey's oldest daughter. Rodriguez and her children migrated to the US in 1977 to be with her mother and siblings.

Death
Lolita died of stroke on November 28, 2016, aged 81, at her home in Hemet, California.

Awards and nominations

Movies

References

External links

1935 births
2016 deaths
20th-century Filipino actresses
Actresses from Pangasinan
Filipino emigrants to the United States
Filipino film actresses
Filipino people of American descent
Filipino television actresses
People from Laguna (province)
People from Urdaneta, Pangasinan